Rosalyn Fatima Gold-Onwude (born April 28, 1987) is an American-Nigerian sports broadcaster. A native of New York City, Gold-Onwude played college basketball at Stanford and played on the Nigeria national team.

Gold-Onwude covers NBA basketball on ESPN's TV, digital, and radio platforms and is a fill-in host of First Take with Stephen A. Smith each week. Since 2012 Gold-Onwude has covered March Madness, the NCAA tournament and Pac-12 Men's and Women's college hoops in both the analyst and reporter role for Pac-12 Networks. Most recently Gold-Onwude has joined forces with Kevin Durant's and Rich Kleiman's 35 Ventures as one of the faces of "The Boardroom". Gold-Onwude was also the host of a sports debate show called "Don't at Me" presented by The Players' Tribune and streaming live Twitter.

Early life 
Gold-Onwude was born in Queens, New York City, to Russian-Jewish mother Pat Gold and Nigerian father Austin Onwude. She played high school basketball at Archbishop Molloy High School in Briarwood, New York. The team won two state titles in 2003 and 2004, but a knee injury finished her senior season early. Despite the injury, she graduated from Molloy as a highly decorated player and became the first female athlete in the program's history to play Division I basketball after accepting a scholarship to Stanford University. Gold-Onwude became Molloy's second all-time leading scorer and the all-time leader in steals and assists despite another knee injury. In 2011, Gold-Onwude became the first Molloy alumna to be inducted into the GCHSAA Hall of Fame.

College career
Gold-Onwude played basketball while earning her bachelor's degree in communications and a master's degree in sociology at Stanford University.

As a member of the Stanford women's basketball team from 2005 to 2010, Gold-Onwude played in three Final Fours and two national championship games helping the Cardinal win four conference titles, as starting guard. In her final season she was named the 2010 Pac-10 Co-Defensive Player of the Year, ending her Stanford career as the school's all-time leader in games played.

National team career
Gold-Onwude represented the Nigeria women's national team at the 2011 FIBA Africa Championship for Women where she averaged 8.1 points, 2.1 rebounds and 2 assists.

Broadcasting
From 2017 to 2019, Gold-Onwude worked for Turner Sports in her first national role, covering the NBA regular season, playoffs, All Star Weekend and NBA Summer League games for TNT and NBATV. Before joining Turner Sports, Gold-Onwude served as the sideline reporter for the Golden State Warriors on NBC Sports Bay Area, covering the Warriors' run to three straight NBA Finals and two championships from 2014 to 2017. Gold-Onwude was the color commentator for the WNBA's NY Liberty from 2011 to 2017 for MSG Networks. Additionally, she joined NBC's coverage of the 2016 Rio Olympics as a sideline reporter for Men's Basketball.
Gold-Onwude has worked as an analyst for the NBA on ESPN Radio since 2022.

Personal life
Gold-Onwude has spoken out about her passion for mentoring young girls, raising awareness for mental health issues and empowering women in business. She has participated in the NBA's Basketball Without Borders Program and NBA Africa Game. In December 2018 she returned to Nigeria to work with the Hope 4 Girls Camp, a girls only basketball camp.

References

External links

Stanford bio (archive)

1987 births
Living people
African-American Jews
Basketball players from New York City
African Games bronze medalists for Nigeria
African Games medalists in basketball
American people of Nigerian descent
American people of Russian-Jewish descent
Archbishop Molloy High School alumni
College basketball announcers in the United States
Competitors at the 2011 All-Africa Games
ESPN people
Jewish American sportspeople
Nigerian women's basketball players
Shooting guards
Sportspeople from Queens, New York
Stanford Cardinal women's basketball players
Women's college basketball announcers in the United States
Women's National Basketball Association announcers
Women's National Basketball Association media
Women sports announcers